The 1989 Orange Bowl was the 55th edition of the college football bowl game, played at the Orange Bowl in Miami, Florida, on Monday, January 2. Part of the 1988–89 bowl game season, it matched the independent and second-ranked Miami Hurricanes and the #6 Nebraska Cornhuskers of the Big Eight Conference. Favored Miami won 23–3.

It was a rematch of the 1984 game, in which Miami had won its first national championship. Despite the high rankings of  the game was not determining of the national title since top-ranked and undefeated Notre Dame (which had defeated Miami by a point earlier in the season) convincingly won the Fiesta Bowl in Arizona earlier 

This was the first Orange Bowl that had an official corporate sponsor, Federal Express (now FedEx), who continued to sponsor the bowl until 2010.

Game summary
The rematch did not turn out to be as close as the 1984 game, and Miami led  at halftime. Nebraska finally scored with a 50-yard field goal in the third quarter, but Miami responded with its own in the fourth. Hurricanes quarterback Steve Walsh also set a new Orange Bowl record with 44 attempted passes, with 21 completions, and was named the game's MVP on offense.

Scoring
First quarter
Miami – Leonard Conley 22-yard pass from Steve Walsh (Carlos Huerta kick)
Second quarter
Miami – Huerta 18-yard field goal
Miami – Conley 42-yard pass from Walsh (Huerta kick)
Miami – Huerta 37-yard field goal
Third quarter
Nebraska – Gregg Barrios 50-yard field goal
Fourth quarter
Miami – Huerta 37-yard field goal

Statistics
{| class=wikitable style="text-align:center"
! Statistics  !! Miami !!  Nebraska 
|-
|align=left|First Downs || 20 || 10
|-
|align=left|Rushes–yards|| 28–69|| 38–80
|-
|align=left|Passing yards || 285 || 55
|-
|align=left|Passes (C–A–I)|| 23–48–3 || 8–22–3
|-
|align=left|Total Offense || 76–354 || 60–135
|-
|align=left|Return yards || 47 || 31
|-
|align=left|Punts–average ||4–40|| 9–37
|-
|align=left|Fumbles–lost ||1–0|| 0–0
|-
|align=left|Turnovers||3||3
|-
|align=left|Penalties-yards ||7–60|| 5–45
|-
|align=left|Time of possession ||30:16||29:44
|}

Aftermath
The game was head coach Jimmy Johnson's last with Miami, as he left in February to become the second head coach of the Dallas Cowboys 

Miami retained its #2 ranking in the final AP poll and Nebraska fell 

Nebraska and Miami have since faced off again in the post-season three times, twice in the Orange Bowl in 1992 and 1995, and once in the Rose Bowl in 2002.

References

Orange Bowl
Orange Bowl
Miami Hurricanes football bowl games
Nebraska Cornhuskers football bowl games
Orange Bowl
January 1989 sports events in the United States